"Moderation" is a song by British band Florence and the Machine, released as a single on 24 January 2019 through Virgin EMI Records. The digital release includes the B-side "Haunted House". It is the band's first new material since their fourth studio album High as Hope (2018).

Background
"Moderation" was debuted during a concert in early January 2019.

Critical reception
"Moderation" was called a "huge, cinematic stomper with gospel handclaps and a gigantic Florence Welch vocal performance at its center" by Stereogum, while "Haunted House" was described as "restrained" in contrast to "Moderation", as well as "softer and more tender". Jon Blistein of Rolling Stone called the songs "brazen", further writing that "Moderation" is a rumbling piano-driven tune" about Welch confronting a "tepid lover", and "Haunted House" is about Welch "tackling the voices that keep her up late at night over a sparse arrangement that swells into a jittery blend of piano, drums and backing vocals". Consequence of Sound called "Moderation" a "rousing number", while "Haunted House" was labelled "spooky and sad". Billboard said "Moderation" "starts with a bang, a rousing intro", and that "Haunted House" "reveals Welch's somber side, with a tender piano accompanying Welch's lilting voice".

Track listing

Charts

Weekly charts

Year-end charts

References

2019 singles
2019 songs
Florence and the Machine songs
Songs written by James Ford (musician)
Songs written by Doveman
Songs written by Florence Welch